Milton Müller (born 28 May 1990 in Rosario, Santa Fe) is an Argentine soccer player. He is currently playing for Aldosivi.

Club career
During the 2008-2009 season, he had 21 caps and eight goals for Larissa Youth Team. Marinos Ouzounidis was very pleased with his success and he promoted him to the first team in the middle of the season, while he was still playing games with the youth team. However, he had no caps with the first team during the 2008-2009 season.

References

External links
Müller's Profile (Greek) at Larissa's official website

1990 births
Living people
Argentine footballers
Argentine expatriate footballers
Argentine people of German descent
A.C. Barnechea footballers
Newell's Old Boys footballers
Athlitiki Enosi Larissa F.C. players
Aldosivi footballers
Primera B de Chile players
Expatriate footballers in Chile
Expatriate footballers in Cyprus
Expatriate footballers in Greece
Footballers from Rosario, Santa Fe
Association football midfielders